Margaret Court and Virginia Wade were the defending champions but only Wade competed that year. Wade and Olga Morozova lost in the final 6–1, 6–4 against Linky Boshoff and Ilana Kloss.

Seeds

Draw

Finals

Top half

Section 1

Section 2

Bottom half

Section 3

Section 4

References

External links
1976 US Open – Women's draws and results at the International Tennis Federation

Women's Doubles, 1976
US Open (tennis) by year – Women's doubles
1976 in women's tennis
1976 in American women's sports